In the Second Polish Republic, there was not a national, Second Division, as we know it today, although the creation of the second division was proposed on several occasions. On Sunday, September 26, 1937 in Częstochowa, a conference of regional teams from across the nation took place, to discuss the creation of the league. Officials of several clubs arrived, such as Brygada Częstochowa, Gryf Toruń, Śmigły Wilno, Rewera Stanisławów, Dąb Katowice, Unia Sosnowiec, Strzelec Janowa Dolina, and WKS Grodno. Also, invited were officials of HCP Poznań, Podgorze Kraków, Naprzód Lipiny and Union Touring Łódź, but for unknown reasons they did not show up. The officials talked about creation of a National B-League, but nothing came out of this project. Instead, in the years 1921-1939, several Voivodeships held their own games and those leagues were known as A-Classes. In 1927, the elite Polish Football League was created, which by the late 1930s consisted of 10 teams. The teams that did not make it to the Ekstraklasa, played in the A-Classes.

A-Classes 
In the year of the 1921 Polish Football Championship only five A-Classes managed to conclude the full seasons, namely: Poznań, Lwów, Kraków, Warsaw and Łódź. The next year they were joined by Wilno, Lublin (Volhynia) and Silesia.

Between 1927 and 1939 there were several A-Classes, such as:

 Kielce A-Class, from which in mid-1930s the separate, Zagłębie Dąbrowskie A-Class emerged, with teams from such cities as Sosnowiec, Będzin, Zawiercie or Częstochowa. After this, Kielce A-Class ceased to exist, and some of its teams, such as Star Starachowice, moved to Warsaw A-Class,
 Białystok - Grodno A-Class
 Kraków A-Class, also called Kraków League
 Łódź A-Class
 Lwów A-Class, also called Lwów League
 Polesie A-Class
 Pomerania A-Class
 Poznań A-Class
 Silesian A-Class, also called Silesia League (it was regarded as the strongest of all, with several top-quality teams and players)
 Stanisławów A-Class
 Volhynia A-Class
 Warsaw A-Class
 Wilno A-Class
 Zagłębie Dąbrowskie A-Class (since mid-1930s)

It must be mentioned that not all Voivodeships had their own A-Classes. Football system in some areas located mainly in the Eastern Provinces (Kresy Wschodnie) was not developed enough (or did not have enough teams) to keep their own A-Class Leagues.  So, there was no Nowogródek Voivodeship A-Class, or Tarnopol Voivodeship A-Class. Instead, the existing teams from those regions played each other in knock-out stage games, thus establishing a regional Champion.

Interesting is the fact that in several cases, teams from one Voivodeship played in the A-Class of another region - e.g. Koszarawa Żywiec from Kraków Voivodeship, played in mid-1930s in the Silesian A-Class, SKS (Star) Starachowice, played in late-1930s in Warsaw A-Class, even though the city of Starachowice was located in Kielce Voivodeship, or Pogon Stryj, which played in Lwów A-Class, but the town of Stryj was located in the Stanisławów Voivodeship.

B and C Classes 
Also, there were third and fourth tier Leagues in Poland - B-Classes (usually covering the areas of 4-5 counties) and C-Classes. Champions of these divisions were automatically promoted to upper levels.

The promotion to the Ekstraklasa 
To get promoted to the elite, 10-team Ekstraklasa, it was not enough to win the A-Class games. The promotion was a long and arduous process, which can be best described by recollecting the games of Śląsk Świętochłowice, which was the winner of the 1938-1939 Silesian A-Class. In the early summer 1939, Śląsk started its way to the Ekstraklasa. In the first stage, it competed against champions of the neighboring A-Classes - Fablok Chrzanów (Kraków A-Class) and Unia Sosnowiec (Zagłębie Dąbrowskie A-Class). Śląsk, with such renowned players as Hubert Gad and Ewald Cebula, at home beat both Fablok and Unia 4-0. Away, it tied 1-1 with Fablok and won 3-2 with Unia, becoming the Champion of southwest Poland A-Classes. In August 1939, the second, national stage started. In it, Śląsk played champions of northwest Poland A-Classes (Legia Poznań), northeast Poland A-Classes (Śmigły Wilno) and southeast Poland A-Classes (Junak Drohobycz). Out of the four teams, three were going to be promoted. Śląsk managed to play only two games - 0-0 in Drohobycz and 2-1 at home with Śmigły Wilno. Then, on September 1, 1939, Germany attacked Poland and all matches were suspended.

List of A-Class Teams in Poland, Spring 1939

Białystok - Grodno A-Class Teams

In the fall of 1938 in this League played the following teams:

 WKS Grodno
 Makabi Białystok
 Strzelec Białystok
 Cresovia Grodno
 Makabi Grodno
 Ognisko Białystok
 Makabi Łomża

Kraków A-Class Teams

In the spring of 1939 in this League played the following teams:

 KS Chełmek
 Cracovia II Kraków
 Fablok Chrzanów
 Garbarnia II Kraków
 Grzegorzecki Kraków
 Korona Kraków
 Krowodrza Kraków
 Makabi Kraków
 KS Tarnów-Moscice
 Olsza Kraków
 Podgorze Kraków
 Tarnovia Tarnów
 Wisla II Kraków
 Zwierzyniecki Kraków

Łódź A-Class Teams

In the spring of 1939 in this League played the following teams:

 Burza Pabianice
 ŁKS Łódź
 ŁTSG Łódź
 PTC Pabianice
 SKS Łódź
 Sokol Pabianice
 Sokol Zgierz
 Strzelecki KS Łódź
 Union-Touring II Łódź
 WIMA Łódź
 WKS Łódź
 Zjednoczeni Łódź

Lublin A-Class Teams

Lwów A-Class Teams 

In the spring of 1939 there were following teams in the Lwów A-Class:

 Czarni Lwów
 Hasmonea Lwów
 Junak Drohobycz
 Korona Sambor
 Lechia Lwów
 Pogon II Lwów
 Pogoń Stryj
 Polonia Przemyśl
 Resovia Rzeszów
 Sian Przemyśl
 RKS Lwów
 Ukraina Lwów
 WKS Jarosław

Pomerania A-Class Teams

In the spring of 1939 in this League played the following teams:

 Bałtyk Gdynia
 Ciszewski Bydgoszcz
 AKS Grudziądz
 Gryf Toruń
 Kotwica Gdynia
 Pomorzanin Toruń
 Polonia Bydgoszcz
 Unia Tczew

Poznań A-Class Teams

In the spring of 1939 there were following teams in the Poznań A-Class:

 HCP Poznań
 KPW Poznań
 Legia Poznań
 Pentatlon Poznań
 Polonia Leszno
 Polonia Poznań
 Stella Gniezno
 Warta II Poznań

Silesian A-Class Teams

In the spring of 1939, Silesian A-Class consisted of 12 teams. These were:

 BBTS Bielsko
 Concordia Knurów
 KS Chorzów Stary
 Czarni Chropaczow
 Dąb Katowice
 Ligocianka Ligota
 Naprzód Lipiny
 KKS Pogon Katowice
 Policyjny KS Katowice
 Polonia Karwina (this team was added in March 1939, after the annexation of Zaolzie into Poland)
 Śląsk Świętochłowice
 Wawel Wirek

Stanisławów Liga okręgowa (1933-1939)

All time table
In italic are names of the clubs that did not participate in the last season.

Notes:
Pogon Stryj played here only for a single season and returned to the Lviv Liga okręgowa.
Game Rypne - Pokucie Kolomyja 1:18 was canceled, due to suspected fraud.
KS stands for Sport Club (Klub Sportowy)
ST stands for Sport Association (Sportowe Towarzystwo)
WCKS stands for Military-Civilian Sport Club (Wojskowe-Civilny Klub Sportowy)
SKS stands for Sport Club Stanislawow (or Stryi) 
pp stands for Infantry Regiment

Volhynia A-Class Teams

In the spring of 1939 in this League played the following teams:

 Hasmonea Łuck
 Hasmonea Rowne
 Policyjny Klub Sportowy Łuck
 Pogon Rowne
 Strzelec Janowa Dolina
 Strzelec Kowel
 Strzelec Rowne
 Wojskowy Klub Sportowy Dubno
 WKS Luck

Warsaw A-Class Teams

In the spring of 1939 the following teams played in Warsaw A-Class:

 CWS Warszawa
 Fort Bema Warszawa
 Granat Skarzysko
 Okecie Warszawa
 Orkan Sochaczew
 PWATT Warszawa
 PZL Warszawa
 SK Starachowice
 Skra Warszawa
 Znicz Pruszków

Zagłębie Dąbrowskie-Częstochowa A-Class Teams

In the spring of 1939 in this League played the following teams:

 Brygada Częstochowa
 Brynica Czeladź
 CKS Czeladź
 Sarmacja Będzin
 RKS Skra Częstochowa
 Unia Sosnowiec
 Warta Częstochowa
 Warta Zawiercie
 Zaglebianka Będzin
 Zaglebie Dąbrowa Górnicza

Schematic division of Class A in regional districts and selected sub-districts 

(*) - Kielce DFA został rozwiązany w 1937, w jego miejsce powołany Zagłębie DFA. Kielce jako podokręg przeniosły się do Krakow DFA
(**) - do października 1927 as Toruń DFA
(***) - from 1932 Class A of Śląsk District was called Śląsk League
(7) - w nawiasach rozgrywki nieoficjalne
po. - sub-district (Podokręgi)
7 - ilość drużyn występujących w A klasie
7/7 - ilość grup
{7} - tzw. grupa robotnicza (skupiająca kluby fabrykanckie i robotnicze)
7 - pogrubienie oznacza Ligę Okręgową

References

2
Football leagues in Poland
1927 in Polish football
1928 in Polish football
1929 in Polish football
1930 in Polish football
1931 in Polish football
1932 in Polish football
1933 in Polish football
1934 in Polish football
1935 in Polish football
1936 in Polish football
1937 in Polish football
1938 in Polish football
1939 in Polish football